Hot in the Shade is the fifteenth studio album by American rock band Kiss, released in 1989. It is the first Kiss studio album since 1981's Music From "The Elder" to feature lead vocals from someone other than Paul Stanley or Gene Simmons, with drummer Eric Carr singing lead on "Little Caesar". It is also the final Kiss album in its entirety to feature Carr before his death in November 1991 during production of the band’s next album Revenge. Unlike its predecessor album, 1987's Crazy Nights, Hot in the Shade does not heavily feature keyboards.

The album includes the biggest hit of the band's non-makeup era, the power ballad "Forever", which was co-written by Stanley and Michael Bolton. The single reached No. 8 on the Billboard Hot 100 in April 1990.

Composition
Hot in the Shade showcases a more straight-ahead sound, following the keyboard-centered pop-metal of Crazy Nights. It contains 15 songs, the most of any Kiss studio album, and is one of the band's longest, with a running time of nearly an hour (58:39). Future band member Tommy Thayer co-wrote "Betrayed" and "The Street Giveth and the Street Taketh Away".

Recording
The album was recorded during the summer of 1989 at the Fortress in Hollywood. Aiming for a more stripped-down sound, Simmons and Carr reportedly decided to record the album there after considering several different studios. To further give the album a more raw feel, along with being able to produce the album with a lower budget, the band elected to use the demos they recorded and polish them up via overdubs instead of re-recording the songs.

"Little Caesar" was Eric Carr's only lead vocal on an original song, although he previously sang lead on a re-recorded version of "Beth" for the compilation album Smashes, Thrashes & Hits.

Artwork and packaging
The album liner notes thanked a dozen Kiss fan-published magazines that helped Kiss fans connect with the band and keep up to date with each member's activities. The liner notes concluded with a warning to fans about the HIV/AIDS epidemic, asking fans to use condoms to reduce the risk of catching and spreading it, adding, "AIDS is no party".

Promotion

Three music videos were made for the promotion of the album. 

The first was "Hide Your Heart", a concept video filmed on a rooftop in Los Angeles. 

The second video, "Rise to It", shows Gene Simmons and Paul Stanley appearing in Kiss makeup for the first time since their 1983 unmasking. Although the fictional scene with Simmons and Stanley in makeup was supposedly set in 1975. Both videos were held to be released in January and April 1990 to MTV.  

The final video, "Forever," depicts the band in sepia tone monochrome, with yellow highlights from the sunlight. Even though "Rise to It" was shot and edited before "Forever", "Forever" was released as the second music video from the album to take advantage of the radio airplay the ballad was receiving. The "Forever" music video also reached No. 1 on Dial MTV and reached No. 47 on MTV's top 100 videos for 1990. 

Of the 15 tracks on the album, only five were performed live. "Forever" was a pop hit and became a semi-regular part of the live setlist. "Hide Your Heart" was played in 2014 on the Kiss 40th Anniversary World Tour.

Reception

Hot in the Shade was certified Gold on December 20, 1989, by the RIAA.

Its most successful single, "Forever", reached No. 8 on the Billboard charts, the band's highest-charting single in the US since "Beth" 13 years earlier.

Track listing

Personnel
Kiss
Paul Stanley – vocals, rhythm guitar, slide guitar on "Rise to It", acoustic guitar on "Forever", brass arrangements on "Cadillac Dreams", producer
Gene Simmons – vocals, bass guitar; rhythm guitar on "Cadillac Dreams", producer
Eric Carr – drums, percussion, vocals, bass on "Little Caesar"
Bruce Kulick – lead guitar, backing vocals, all guitars on "Little Caesar", bass and acoustic guitar solo on "Forever"

Additional musicians
Phil Ashley – keyboards on "Hide Your Heart" and "Forever"
The Sisters of No Mercy (Charlotte Crossley, Valerie Pinkston, Kim Edwards-Brown) – backing vocals on "Silver Spoon"
Pat Regan – saxes on "Cadillac Dreams"
All Star Cadillac Brass – end horns on "Cadillac Dreams"
Kevin Valentine – drums on "King of Hearts" and "You Love Me to Hate You"
Tommy Thayer – electroacoustic guitar on "Betrayed" and "The Street Giveth and the Street Taketh Away"

Production
Pat Regan – engineer
Mikey Davis – additional engineering
Dave Wittman – mixing at the Cherokee Studios, Los Angeles
Greg Fulginiti – mastering at Artisan Sound Recorders, Hollywood
Michael Bays – art direction
Mitchell Kanner – art direction, cover design
Scott Townsend – cover design

Charts

Weekly charts

Year-end charts

Singles

Certifications

References

External links
 

1989 albums
Kiss (band) albums
Albums produced by Gene Simmons
Albums produced by Paul Stanley
Mercury Records albums
Vertigo Records albums